Oito Batutas have been deemed to be one of the most influential groups on Brazilian music.  They were led by Pixinguinha with whom they debuted on April 7, 1919 at the Cinema Palais in Rio de Janeiro.

External links 

Free recordings in International Music Score Library Project (IMSLP)

Musical groups established in 1919
Musical groups disestablished in 1927
Samba ensembles
1919 establishments in Brazil
1927 disestablishments in Brazil